Ebsbury Down is a  biological Site of Special Scientific Interest in Wiltshire, England, notified in 1975.

It lies on the southern slopes of the Wylye valley, adjacent to Grovely Wood and west of Great Wishford village. The diverse chalk grassland has a variety of plants and some prominent anthills.

Sources

External links
 Natural England website (SSSI information)

Sites of Special Scientific Interest in Wiltshire
Sites of Special Scientific Interest notified in 1975